Chandra Kamal Bezbaruah College also known as CKB College, Teok, established in 1959, is a general degree college situated at Jogduar, Teok, in Jorhat district, Assam. This college is affiliated with the Dibrugarh University.

Departments

Arts and Commerce
 Assamese
 English
History
Education
Economics
Political Science
Sociology
Commerce

References

External links
http://www.ckbcollegeteok.com/

Universities and colleges in Assam
Colleges affiliated to Dibrugarh University
Educational institutions established in 1959
1959 establishments in Assam